Big Dog is an album by Seven Nations, released in 1996 on their own label.

Track listing
Under the Milky Way (cover of The Church song)
Crooked Jack
The Mountains of Pomeroy/Garrett Barry's/Snug in a Blanket/Iain's Jig/Clumsy Lover/Itchy Fingers
Finish Line
Our Day Will Come
Johnny Cope/Fermoy Loses/Jerusalem Rap
Blackleg Miner/Mairi Anne MacInnes
The Selling of Waternish
Big Dog/Trip to Pakistan
Finish Line (reprise)

Seven Nations (band) albums
1996 albums